Wayne Harrison may refer to:

Wayne Harrison (director) (born 1953), Australian director
Wayne Harrison (footballer, born 1957), English footballer, mostly played for Blackpool
Wayne Harrison (footballer, born 1967) (1967–2013), English footballer, mostly played for Oldham, transferred to Liverpool